Moringa may refer to:

 Moringa (genus), a genus of plants
 Moringa oleifera, or just moringa, a plant species native to the Indian subcontinent
 Moringa stenopetala, a species in that genus commonly known as the African moringa

See also 
 Morinda (disambiguation)
 Morenga (disambiguation)
 Morina (disambiguation)